Take Me Out Indonesia is reality show based on the format of Taken Out and aired by Indosiar from the date of June 19, 2009 until June 30, 2013, then aired by antv from September 19, 2016 until August 27, 2017, and GTV from July 27, 2019 until March 26, 2020. Take Me Out Indonesia is a search-themed event and broadcast partner for 2 hours (90 minutes since the 3rd). In this event, the 30 single women standing behind the podium pick 7 single men, introduced one by one. In 2016, the show is back again but this time is shown on antv because a TV station which is usually a TMOI broadcasting rights for approximately 4 years (2009-2013), Indosiar choose to stop contracts and chose to focus on the program "dangdut". In 2019, the show is back again but this time is shown on GTV because some of Fremantle's TV show that aired on this channel due to the cooperation between them.

External links 
 Official website
 Facebook
 Twitter
 Youtube
 Instagram

Indonesian television series based on non-Indonesian television series
2009 Indonesian television series debuts
Television series by Fremantle (company)
Indosiar original programming
ANTV original programming